Latanites is an extinct genus of plants belonging to the family Arecaceae.

Fossil record
Fossil palms of this genus are dating back to the Middle Eocene and to the Early-Middle Oligocene (between 50 and 30 million years ago). They have been found in the famous deposits of Bolca and other nearby sites. The giant Latanites maximiliani could reach a high of more than three meters.

References

Arecaceae
Prehistoric angiosperm genera
Arecaceae genera